Erik Pevernagie (born 1939) is a Belgian painter and writer, living in Uccle (Brussels), who has held exhibitions in Paris, New York City, Berlin, Düsseldorf, Amsterdam, London, Brussels and Antwerp.

Life

Pevernagie has his background in Brussels, a bilingual city where Latin and Germanic cultures mix. He is the son and pupil of the expressionist painter Louis Pevernagie (1904–1970). From the start, he was interested in the Anglo-Saxon and Germanic cultural heritage and became a Master in Germanic Philology at the Free University of Brussels (1961). He took a postgraduate degree at Cambridge University (UK) and became a Professor at Erasmus University. A Master's degree Leisure Agogics (1971) motivated him to create a social & cultural non-profit located on two boats in the Port of Brussels: "Ric's River Boat" and "Ric's Art Boat", which allowed him to meet remarkable characters in the art world. He became an associated academician of Accademia Internazionale del Verbano di Lettere, Arti, Scienze.

Work

The artist seems to get his inspiration from several aspects of the social fabric. Communication and in-communication are recurring central themes in his work. Topics like alienation, seclusion, unrest, and insecurity appear to be starting points for visual productions. Viewing a painting becomes a semiotic experience, and words, titles, sentences, and graffiti should be extensions and elucidations of a visual effect. Creating work is, at the same time, plastic and literary.

If "details" add to the structure of the work, the small items of life seem to be the cornerstones through which the viewer can comprehend the world. While particular events from the collective memory are translated into the canvas, the artistic approach consists of hiding the subject in a singular environment.

The whole work is practically unclassifiable, as various currents seem to culminate in it. While the characters are integrated into their environment through geometric lines and compositional planes, figuration and abstractionism are forced to a compromise, visibly with a view to generating a range of emotions and reflections.</ref></ref>

As the material on the canvas and the color process play an essential role, sand and metal filings are used to give a distinctive texture. The artist obviously has a dialectical approach towards "presence" and "absence" and towards the "painted" and "non-painted" matter in art, which seems to create a kind of tension, visually and mentally.

Quotes

"Erik Pevernagie is primarily known for combining both figurative and abstract elements in his works. Starting with a simple geometric sketch or "graffiti", he builds the surface with materials such as ashes, sand or metal chips." (Doyle New York)
"'Man' stands in the heart of his work: man integrated into his natural environment, sometimes even absorbed by it. On the other hand, he seems to deny it, as Pevernagie introduces graffiti in his paintings. So doing, he gives evidence of the solitude of the human being, his alienation in the urban texture."  (Benezit Dictionary of Artists, Paris)
"Bridging the gaps between generations, social strata, and nationalities is a tricky business. However, Erik Pevernagie may have hit upon a workable formula to ease the alienation. " (International Herald Tribune)
"By denying any physical presence of the character and leaving simply dress evidence, the artist gives us a reproduction of the ground zero of the mind. His anti-hero has decided to make tabula rasa and get rid of all acquired alleged qualities."  (Christie's, New York, Catalogue)
"His message, like a light beam across the fog of the human condition, calls our attention to the fragment to help us to explore the universe. The detail is chosen as the starting point of the possible knowledge, deepening our perception and conscience. Pevernagie offers us the first pieces of a puzzle we have to assemble. He freezes the moment as a password to disclose eternity. His philosophical approach to the "essence" is further materialized by a choice of technical parameters: the flatness of the perspective, the geometrical shapes, the narrow chromatic range, the use of material elements such as sand and metal files...somehow recalling the Egyptian art, an art based on the language of icons and symbols, to explore and explain the mystery." (R.Puvia, London)
"Belgian artist who adds geometrical color surfaces in his work to characters or architectural spaces. In addition, he uses material on his canvasses such as sand and metal chips, which grant to his pictures their special surface texture and which seem to submerge the separate entities into a refined moderate colouredness through the reflection of the light." (Ketterer, Hamburg)
"The human being who is present in all his work is reduced to a congruent portion. Some pale traits and bodies blend into the canvas, leaving space for accessories, highlighted by the artist in a more figurative manner. The material is omnipresent in Erik Pevernagie's paintings and gives to his work all the intensity of the messages he tries to transmit. Metal, aluminum, sand. The ruggedness of his canvasses is perfectly in tune with the long vanishing lines and the sharp angles of his paintings." (M. Ladaveze)
"Typical exponent of the contemporary artist who combines abstract and figurative elements in his work. He starts with an idea and expresses that idea in a plastic way. Thus he depicts a world which has become confused and insecure and asks questions which can be interpreted by the spectator." (Paul Piron, Brussels)
"Mixes figuration and abstraction with a poetic and philosophical key. Important are the framing, the intersections, and the balance of the surfaces. Introduces extraneous substances (ashes, sand, grit, etc.) which give an aspect of strangeness and ruggedness as if he leaves traces of the past." (Arto)
"Always listening to the world around him, Erik Pevernagie grants to our fellow man a dominating place in his paintings. The individual is replaced in his environment, which is sometimes evoked by graffiti, and seems to be absorbed and dissolved by the elements surrounding him. The subtle touches of color, the half-abstract, half-figurative shapes, and the specific framing lead to the dissolution of the individual whose life seems to be but superficiality. Pevernagie invites us to go beyond the superficial barriers in order to discover the mystery behind his characters who are in perpetual tension as if they were waiting for something else, for another life." (LeVif/l'Express)
"Always starting from an event of the collective memory, Pevernagie paints a very insecure world in his very particular way. Half figurative, half abstract, he mixes elements of earth, sand, and metal cuttings on his canvas in sober beige, grey, and velvet red tones. He starts with simple graffiti, a sketch of a person, or a detail from daily life. These are used as a pretext for a network of pure and well-structured geometrical lines covering the whole surface of the canvas in order to bring about emotion. The titles are like twinklings in the eye.They are to be interpreted as one feels them. In the first degree or in the second degree. Astonishing in this work is the message that is brought to life. The artist asks questions. Life is seen by Pevernagie in different ways, and painting is a way to express them. The paintbrush is a means of evasion and the color a gate to reflection." (Rey-Berthot)
"The figures of Erik Pevernagie are absorbed, integrated into their environment by the color, the lines, and by the" idea", which is most important in his work. He starts with an idea, and then he paints it. With him, we find the problems which keep him busy, which haunt us, and which he depicts. He paints the alienation, the loneliness, the unrest, the uncertainty. Erik Pevernagie paints for a generation. Our world has been decomposed, fallen into pieces, and become uncertain and unseizable. But art and poetry are ultimate recourses. Erik Pevernagie's work is thrilling. With him, we enter a totally different universe than the recognizable and readable reality. It's a universe we can interpret.In his art, questions are put. He has a vision of man and the world. This artist is captivated by his topics and by the way he is painting them. He brings about a change in our way of looking at the world. " (Professor W. Toebosch)
"For me, it's even more, the shape that one perceives than the idea of the painter, which astonishes and alienates me. The painter obviously starts from a situation in everyday life. The shape and the structure impose themselves and create some disturbance. The canvas is almost empty. No cumbersome details. No technical tricks. I understand that it's the " details ", the small objects of life that surround us and which form the framework through which we perceive the world, which stimulates and encourage the thought. These objects often replace the interior world with many people." (L. Krasnova)

Bibliography
 The Dictionary of International Biography, Melrose Press Ltd, Ely, Cambridgeshire, UK, 20
 Dictionnaire de Référence, Bénézit, Paris, Gründ, 1999
 Le Delarge, Le Dictionnaire des arts plastiques modernes et contemporains, 2009–2012
 Le Dictionnaire des artistes plasticiens en Belgique 1800-2002, Arto, 2003
 Dictionnaire des artistes plasticiens belges, P. Piron, 2003
 Beeldend Benelux, Petrus Maria Josephus Emiel Jacobs, Encyclopédie: (Le-Po), Tilburg, 2000, p. 603
 Guida Internazionale delle Belle Arti, 2015, MP PROGETTI, p. 109
 Belgian Journal of Philology and History 1962, Volume 40 - 40-2 Number pp. 540–692. Erik Pevernagie: Ivy Compton-Burnett "The children in her works"
 Goodreads: Erik Pevernagie Quotes
 Literary Quotes Pevernagie
 Erik Pevernagie: "Words of Wisdom" - 12 March 2020,  
 About the philosophy of the Painting of Pevernagie
 "Let Us Say More And Speak Less" - Erik Pevernagie, Kindle Edition  Published 3 December 2020,
 "Stilling our Mind" - Erik Pevernagie, Independently published.  Published 4 August 2021,
 "The rabbit hole of Meditation" - Erik Pevernagie, Independently published -USA, 26 October 2022,

References

External links

Erik Pevernagie Revisited
 Erik Pevernagie philosophy
  Artist's quotes

Belgian painters
1939 births
Living people
Free University of Brussels (1834–1969) alumni
Academic staff of Erasmus University Rotterdam